Andilanatoby is a rural municipality in Madagascar. It is situated at 55 km south-east of Ambatondrazaka and also belongs to the district with the same name: Ambatondrazaka, which is a part of Alaotra-Mangoro Region. The population of the commune was estimated to be approximately 22,000 in 2001 commune census.

Primary and junior level secondary education are available in town. The majority 85% of the population of the commune are farmers, while an additional 10% receives their livelihood from raising livestock. The most important crop is rice, while other important products are beans and cassava.  Services provide employment for 2% of the population. Additionally fishing employs 3% of the population.

Roads
Andilanatoby is a railway station on the Moramanga - Alaotra Lake line.
Also the Route nationale 44 passes this municipality.

Rivers
The Ranofotsy, which is an affluent of the Maningory River.

References 

Populated places in Alaotra-Mangoro